Isla de Las Palomas is an island opposite the town of Tarifa at the southern end of the Punta de Tarifa at the southernmost point of the Iberian Peninsula and continental Europe.  The island has been connected to the mainland by causeway since 1808.

References 

Tarifa
Islands of Spain
Landforms of Andalusia